Ust-Bolsheretsky District is an administrative  and municipal district (raion) of Kamchatka Krai, Russia, one of the eleven in the krai. It is located in the southern and southwestern parts of the krai. Its administrative center is the rural locality (a selo) of Ust-Bolsheretsk. Population:  The population of Ust-Bolsheretsk accounts for 25.4% of the district's total population.

References

Notes

Sources

Districts of Kamchatka Krai